Lykoshino is the name of several rural localities in Russia:
Lykoshino (settlement), Bologovsky District, Tver Oblast, a settlement in Bologovsky District of Tver Oblast
Lykoshino (village), Bologovsky District, Tver Oblast, a village in Bologovsky District of Tver Oblast
Lykoshino, Lesnoy District, Tver Oblast, a village in Lesnoy District of Tver Oblast
Lykoshino, Danilovsky District, Yaroslavl Oblast, a village in Danilovsky District of Yaroslavl Oblast
Lykoshino, Tutayevsky District, Yaroslavl Oblast, a village in Tutayevsky District of Yaroslavl Oblast

See also
Lykoshina, a village in Sorokinsky District of Tyumen Oblast